Init sa Magdamag (International title: When Love Burns / is a Philippine television drama broadcast by Kapamilya Channel, A2Z and TV5. It aired from April 19, 2021 to September 10, 2021 on the channel's Primetime Bida evening block and worldwide via The Filipino Channel, replacing Walang Hanggang Paalam.

Series overview

 Season 2: 7/5/2021-7/23/2021
 Season 3: 7/26/2021-8/20/2021
 Season 4: 8/23/2021-9/10/2021
 iWantTFC shows two episodes first in advance before its television broadcast.

Episodes

Season 1

References

Lists of Philippine drama television series episodes